Nine-ball (sometimes written 9-ball) is a discipline of the cue sport pool. The game's origins are traceable to the 1920s in the United States. Using a cue stick, players must strike the white cue ball to  nine colored billiard balls, hitting them in ascending numerical order.

The game is currently governed by the World Pool-Billiard Association (WPA), with multiple regional tours. The most prestigious nine-ball tournaments are the WPA World Nine-ball Championship and the U.S. Open Nine-ball Championships. Notable 9-Ball players in the game include Luther Lassiter, Buddy Hall, Earl Strickland and Shane Van Boening. The game is often associated with hustling and gambling, with tournaments often having a "buy-in" amount to become a participant. The sport has featured in popular culture, notably in the 1961 film The Hustler and its 1986 sequel The Color of Money.

Nine-ball has been played with varied rules, with games such as ten-ball, seven-ball and three-ball being derived from the game. While usually a singles sport, the game can be played in doubles, with players completing alternate shots. Examples of tournaments featuring doubles include the World Cup of Pool, World Team Championship and the Mosconi Cup.

History
The game was established in America by 1920, although the exact origins are unknown. Nine-ball is played with the same equipment as eight-ball and other pool games.

Rules
The game of nine-ball is played on a billiard table with six pockets. The , which is usually a solid shade of white (but may be spotted in some tournaments), is struck to hit the nine , which are numbered 1 through 9, each a distinct color, with the 9-ball typically having a yellow stripe on a white base. The aim of the game is to hit the lowest numbered ball on the table (often referred to as the ) and  balls in succession to eventually pocket the nine-ball. As long as the lowest numbered ball on the table is contacted first by the cueball, and any one or more of the object balls are pocketed in any of the pockets with no  being committed, a player's  continues. When the table passes to another player, they must play from where the balls were last positioned, except if the prior inning ended in a foul. In that case, the incoming player takes , anywhere on the table. The winner is the player who legally pockets the nine-ball, the game's , regardless of how many balls have been pocketed beforehand.

Breaking

The rack used to position the balls may be either triangle-shaped, as is used for eight-ball and other pool games, or a specific diamond-shaped rack that holds only nine balls may be used. Racks are usually made of wood or plastic. A template that lies on the table during the break has also come into use.

The break consists of hitting the 1-ball, with the attempt to pocket any ball. If the nine-ball is successfully potted, the player automatically wins the rack. The break is often the most crucial shot in nine-ball, as it is possible to win a rack without the opponent having a single shot. Earl Strickland holds the record for break and runs, after he successfully ran 11 consecutive racks in a tournament in 1996.

Push out and fouls
The rules on a push out are different to those of a regular shot, as the shot does not need to hit a rail or ball. After the push out, the opposing player has the option to play the shot that has been left, or to force their opponent to play on from that location. In early versions of nine-ball the push out could be called at any time during the game, but is now only for the shot after the break.

If a player misses potting a ball on a shot, or commits a foul shot, then their opponent plays the next shot. A foul shot for any reason offers the opponent , which means they can place the cue ball at any location on the table. A player making three successive fouls (for any reason) awards that rack to the opponent. Unlike some other cue sports, such as snooker, players are allowed to jump the cue ball over other balls. However, if any ball leaves the cloth at the end of a shot, it is counted as a foul. Jumping is common in nine-ball, and players often have a dedicated jump cue.

European alterations

As of the 2000s, the rules have been somewhat in flux in certain contexts, especially in Europe. The European Pocket Billiard Federation (EPBF), the WPA-affiliate in Europe, has instituted a requirement on the Euro Tour is that the break shot be taken from a "" a rectangular box smaller than the regular nine-ball breaking area. While making the money ball on breaks are still possible, they are much more difficult with the break box. This was later used on the annual international Mosconi Cup tournaments.

Governance
The general rules of the game are fairly consistent and usually do not stray too far from the earliest format set by the Billiard Congress of America (BCA). These later formed the basis of the standardized WPA rules, which the BCA follows as a member, although amateur league play may be governed by similar but slightly different rules promulgated by the American Poolplayers Association (APA) and other organizations.

Tournaments
Nine-ball events worldwide are run at the highest level by the WPA. The WPA World Nine-ball Championship has events for men, women and junior players. Events are generally open to any player who can pay the entry fee, however, some events are based on qualification. The WPA hosts a world ranking schedule based on WPA events, with other ranking systems also operated by the APA and the EPBF. Other major events held by the WPA include the U.S. Open 9-Ball Championship, China Open 9-Ball Championship and the International 9-Ball Open. In addition, Matchroom Sport runs major events such as the Mosconi Cup, World Cup of Pool and World Pool Masters.

Outside those events held on an worldwide basis, nine-ball is played in continental tour series. Events are held on series such as the Diamond Pool Tour, Asian Tour and Euro Tour.

Derived games

Several games have been derived from nine-ball. Six-ball is essentially identical to nine-ball but with three fewer balls, which are racked in a three-row triangle, with the money ball placed in the center of the back row. According to Rudolf Wanderone, the game arose in early 20th century billiard halls; halls charged for matches by the 15 ball rack rather than by table, so players of nine-ball had six balls left over. For this reason, the game is often played with the balls numbered between 10 and 15, with the 15-ball as the money ball.

Seven-ball is also similar to nine-ball, though it differs in two key ways: the game uses only seven object balls, which are racked in a hexagon, and players are restricted to pocketing the money ball on their designated side of the table. William D. Clayton is credited with the game's invention in the early 1980s. While not a common game, it was featured on television broadcaster ESPN's Sudden Death Seven-ball which aired in the early 2000s.

The most common derivative game is the game of ten-ball. The game is a more stringent variant, using ten balls in which all pocketed balls must be . Unlike in nine-ball, the money ball cannot be pocketed on the break for an instant win. Due to its more challenging nature, and the fact that there is no publicly known technique for reliably pocketing specific object balls on the break shot, there have been suggestions among the professional circuit that ten-ball should replace nine-ball as the pro game of choice, especially since the rise of the nine-ball soft break, which is still legal in most international and non-European competition. Ten-ball has its own world championship known as the WPA World Ten-ball Championship.

Popular culture
The sport has featured in popular culture, most notably in the 1956 novel The Hustler and its 1961 film adaptation, and the 1984 novel sequel The Color of Money and subsequent film

See also
List of WPA World Nine-ball Champions
Glossary of cue sports terms

References

External links
 

Pool (cue sports)
Sports originating in the United States
Individual sports
Ball games
Indoor sports
Pub games